Breeveld is a hamlet in the Dutch province of Utrecht. It is a part of the municipality of Woerden, and lies about 4 km northeast of the city centre.

The hamlet was first mentioned in 1217 as Bretevelt, and means "wide field". Breeveld has no place name signs.

Gallery

References

Populated places in Utrecht (province)
Woerden